The House is a novel written by Danielle Steel and published by Delacorte Press in February 2006. The book is Steel's sixty-eighth novel.

Synopsis
Overlooking San Francisco, a huge mansion in need of repair is viewed by Sarah Anderson, an estate lawyer, who has just inherited a huge fortune from a deceased client with the intention of spending it on something that she desires. Sarah restores the mansion, drawn to its grandeur and beauty with the help of architect Jeff Parker, who is as passionate about the house as she. As the two work together, they fall in love with the house and then each other as the house touches both of them and opens their hearts once more.

Footnotes
http://www.randomhouse.com/features/steel/bookshelf/display.pperl?isbn=9780385338288

2006 American novels
American romance novels

Novels by Danielle Steel
Novels set in San Francisco
Delacorte Press books